Lobbes Abbey was a Benedictine monastery in Wallonia in the municipality of Lobbes, Hainaut, Belgium. The abbey played an important role in the religious, political and religious life of the Prince-Bishopric of Liège, especially around the year 1000. The abbey's founding saint is Saint Landelin;  four other saints are also connected with the abbey

History

Foundation

The early history of Lobbes Abbey is known in relative detail through the fortunate and unusual survival of its annals. The monastery was founded by Saint Landelin around 645. Landelin was a young man from a well-to-do family in Bapaume, who had lived a sinful life as the head of a band of brigands. After repenting, he founded a monastery at the place where he had committed his sins, on the bank of the river Sambre. The number of monks at the new monastery increased rapidly following its instigation. Landelin continued his duties as abbot until 680, when he resigned from his post and dedicated the rest of his life to the worship of God.

Early fame
Landelin was succeeded by Ursmar (Saint Ursmarus) who devoted himself to preaching Christianity among the largely pagan Franks. The fame of Saint Ursmarus and his successors Ermin of Lobbes, Abel of Reims and Theodulph of Lobbes, made Lobbes the most important monastery in Belgium of the time. Under  the sixth Abbot, Anson, (776-800), the abbey's school rose to great fame.

In 864 Hucbert, brother-in-law of Lothair II of Lotharingia, became lay abbot. Through his decadent lifestyle he almost brought the monastery to destitution. His successor, Franco, was both abbot of Lobbes and bishop of Liège, a situation that continued until 960. The abbey largely became a fief of the Bishop of Liège, although ecclesiastically it was situated in the bishopric of Cambrai.

In 954 the abbey was raided and burned during the Hungarian invasions of Europe.

Under the abbots Folcuin (965-990), Heriger of Lobbes (990-1007) and Hugo (1033–1053), the abbey and the school once again attained a great reputation.

Decline
After this period the fame of the abbey gradually declined, until the monastic revival originating from the Bursfelde Congregation brought fresh life in the 15th century. In 1569 Lobbes, St. Vaast's Abbey in Arras, and several other abbeys, were combined to form the Benedictine Congregation of Exempt Monasteries of Flanders.

Dissolution
In 1794, the last abbot, Vulgise de Vignron, and 43 monks were expelled from the monastery by French revolutionary troops. Under the law of 2 September 1796 the abbey was dissolved. Most of the monastic buildings, including the abbey church of Saint Peter, were destroyed. The books and documents were burned. The former burial church of Saint Ursmarus survived as a parish church. A few other minor buildings were later incorporated into a railway station.

Art historical significance
The church of Saint Ursmarus is one of the oldest churches in Belgium. The oldest parts date from Carolingian or Ottonian times. The choir and crypt are in the Romanesque style and stand out by their simplicity. The crypt contains the tombs of Saint Ursmarus and Saint Erminus, as well as tombstones from other abbots. The westwork tower is a typical example of Mosan architecture. The pointed spire was added in the 19th century.

From 1865 until 1870 the church was restored by the architect Eugène Carpentier, who rebuilt large sections of the church and removed all traces of earlier architectural work.

The holdings of the Abbey library included a copy of Lobbes Bible completed in 1084 AD. The Bible is now part of the Tournai Seminary.

See also

List of Merovingian monasteries
Carolingian architecture
Mosan art
Regional characteristics of Romanesque architecture

Notes

References 
 

Christian monasteries in Hainaut (province)
Benedictine monasteries in Belgium
Carolingian architecture
Romanesque architecture in Belgium
Mosan art